Pictou Landing may refer to:

Pictou Landing First Nation
Pictou Landing, Nova Scotia